Frank S. Messersmith (born October 5, 1942) was an American politician in the state of Florida.

Messersmith was born in Springfield, Illinois. An attorney, he served in the Florida House of Representatives for the 85th district from 1980 to 1990, as a Republican.

References

1942 births
Living people
Politicians from Springfield, Illinois
People from Lake Worth Beach, Florida
Southern Illinois University alumni
Florida lawyers
Republican Party members of the Florida House of Representatives